William Penn Wolf (December 1, 1833 – September 19, 1896) was a nineteenth-century politician, lawyer and judge from Iowa.

Biography
Born in Harrisburg, Ohio, Wolf attended public schools as a child and later Holbrook Seminary. He moved to Cedar County, Iowa in 1856, studied law and was admitted to the bar in 1859, commencing practice in Tipton, Iowa. He served as superintendent of public schools and was a member of the Iowa House of Representatives in 1863 and 1864.

During the Civil War, Wolf served as captain of Company I of the 46th Iowa Volunteer Infantry Regiment. He was appointed assistant assessor of internal revenue in 1865, and was a member of the Iowa Senate from 1867 to 1869.

On September 30, 1870, William Smyth, the incumbent Congressman representing Iowa's 2nd congressional district, died while seeking re-election.  His death left a vacancy on the Republican ticket and created a need for an immediate successor to finish out his term. Wolf was elected as a Republican to serve out Smyth's term, while fellow Republican Aylett R. Cotton was elected to succeed him. Wolf served from December 6, 1870, to March 3, 1871, when Cotton's two-year term began.

Afterward, Wolf resumed practicing law in Tipton.  He was again a member of the Iowa House of Representatives from 1881 to 1885, serving as Speaker of the House in 1884.   He was elected a judge of the eighteenth judicial district in the fall of 1894 and served until his death in Tipton on September 19, 1896. He was interred in Masonic Cemetery in Tipton.

External links
 Retrieved on 2008-10-19

1833 births
1896 deaths
Iowa state court judges
Speakers of the Iowa House of Representatives
Republican Party Iowa state senators
Iowa lawyers
Union Army officers
People from Harrisburg, Ohio
People of Iowa in the American Civil War
People from Tipton, Iowa
Republican Party members of the United States House of Representatives from Iowa
19th-century American politicians
19th-century American judges
19th-century American lawyers